Aliabad-e Sar Tang (also Romanized as ‘Alīābād-e Sar Tang; also known as ‘Alīābād-e Tang) is a village in Beyza Rural District, Beyza District, Sepidan County, Fars Province, Iran. At the 2006 census, its population was 554, in 126 families.

References 

Populated places in Beyza County